Pseudo.com was an early streaming content service. It was founded by Josh Harris, who broadcast an AM radio show solely dedicated to the Internet, after which tapes of the show would be carried 12 blocks from the WEVD Radio headquarters to 600 Broadway and uploaded to the internet. It soon evolved into a multi-show network and then further to different streaming channels; Pseudo webcast live audio and video webcasting as well as previously recorded material. Founded in New York in late 1993, Pseudo began to grow in the late 1990s after an influx of capital and the advent of dial up internet taking hold with the general population, growing to a company with multiple streaming channels.

Its parent company Pseudo Programs Inc. filed for bankruptcy following the dot-com bubble. Its assets were purchased by INTV in 2001. Harris claimed in 2008 that Pseudo had been a "fake company" and "the linchpin of a long form piece of conceptual art."

Channels and shows
88HipHop.com
allgames.com
channelP.com
Space Watch
KoolOut.com
Queendom
Beatminerz Radio
88Soul
streetsound
FreQ

Key people
Josh Harris - Founder/Chairman/Luvvy
Jacques Tégé, Jr. - Founder/Animator/Developer
V. Owen Bush - Founder/Producer
Dennis Adamo - Founder/Producer
Jeff Gompertz - Founder/Producer
Volcano - Founder/Producer
Mike Rinzel - Founder/Producer
Cal "Judgecal" Chamberlain - Founder/Producer/Webmaster/Sys-admin
Robert Galinsky - Founder/Ex. Prod. Pseudo Network/Ex. Prod. Pseudo Radio/Founder ChannelP
Thomas "TBo" Linder - Founder/Producer/Sound Designer
Janice Erlbaum - Founder/Producer
Lou Velez - Programmer/Producer
Feedbuck - Projection Designer
Bonnie Weinstein - Chatmaster
Missy Galore - Projection Designer
Dan Melamid - Producer
Randy Nkonoki-Ward - Producer
Joey John - Producer
Uziele Fischer - Producer, Party Thrower
Joey Fortuna - Founder/Programmer/Producer/Inventor
Jess Zaino - Producer
 Chris Torella - Producer
Scot Rubin - SVP Games and Sports
David Grandison - Producer
Ron Marans - Producer
Christian Skovly - Director of Internet Technology
Joli Moniz - Producer
David Bohrman - VP & Washington Bureau Chief at CNN America

References

External links

New York Times Article about Pseudo Assets sold

Privately held companies based in New York City
Defunct companies based in New York City
Internet properties established in 1994
Internet properties disestablished in 2000
Defunct websites
Defunct online companies of the United States
Dot-com bubble
1993 establishments in New York City
2000 disestablishments in New York (state)